Alan Henry Goldberg  (7 August 1940 – 23 July 2016) was an Australian jurist, who served as a judge of the Federal Court of Australia from 3 February 1997 to 4 July 2010.

References

External links

1940 births
2016 deaths
Judges of the Federal Court of Australia
Australian King's Counsel
Australian barristers
Officers of the Order of Australia
University of Melbourne alumni
Yale Law School alumni
Swinburne University of Technology alumni
Australian Jews
Fulbright alumni